Live in Donny's Garage is a Tour EP by indie rock band Pinback.  The EP's namesake comes from the fact that the tracks were recorded inside a garage that once belonged to Donny Van Zandt, who has toured with Pinback in the past as their keyboardist.

Track listing
 "Avignon" - 2:30
 "Shag" - 2:29
 "Crutch" - 3:03
 "Tripoli" - 4:12
 "Hurley" - 3:18
 "Rousseau" - 4:11
 "This Train" - 3:50

Pinback albums
2000 EPs
Live EPs